The Vogues Sing the Good Old Songs and Other Hits is the seventh and final album by The Vogues with the original members.

Track listing

† Medley includes bits of "Donna" (Ritchie Valens), "Since I Fell for You" (Buddy Johnson), "I Miss You So" (Jimmy Henderson, Sydney Robin), "So This Is Love" (Steve Howard), and "Goodnight My Love" (George Motola, John Marascalco)

References

The Vogues albums
1970 albums
Reprise Records albums
Albums produced by Dick Glasser